Nicholas Hall is a Melbourne jockey originally from Brisbane, Queensland. He competed in the 2008 Melbourne Cup riding Red Lord and rode in the 2009 Melbourne Cup on C'est La Guerre. He won the 2009 Turnbull Stakes riding Efficient.

Information
He is the son of the 1992 Melbourne Cup winner Greg Hall who is retired and rode multiple group one winners in his career, including the 1992 Cox Plate and Melbourne Cup. Nicholas never showed an interest in riding until he was 17 and decided to try it. He was so inexperienced that the first time he tried to ride a horse, he put the saddle on backwards. He quickly became one of Australia's top riders.

References

Living people
Year of birth missing (living people)
Jockeys from Brisbane